Bryndís Ólafsdóttir (born 17 August 1969) is a retired Icelandic freestyle swimmer. She competed in three events at the 1988 Summer Olympics.

References

External links
 

1969 births
Living people
Bryndis, Olafsdottir
Bryndis, Olafsdottir
Swimmers at the 1988 Summer Olympics
Place of birth missing (living people)